Fort Greene Park is a city-owned and -operated park in Fort Greene, Brooklyn, New York City.  The  park was originally named after the fort formerly located there, Fort Putnam, which itself was named for Rufus Putnam, George Washington's Chief of Engineers in the Revolutionary War. Renamed in 1812 for Nathanael Greene, a hero of the American Revolutionary War, it was redesigned by Frederick Law Olmsted and Calvert Vaux, who also designed Central Park and Prospect Park, in 1867. The park contains the Prison Ship Martyrs' Monument, which includes a crypt designed by Olmsted and Vaux. 

Across the street from its DeKalb Avenue entrance at Ft. Greene Place is Brooklyn Technical High School. To its west is the oldest hospital in Brooklyn, now called the Brooklyn Hospital Center. North of the park are the Walt Whitman Houses, one of the largest housing projects in New York City.

History
The park includes part of the high ground where the Continental Army built fortifications prior to the Battle of Long Island, during the early days of the American Revolutionary War. The site was chosen and construction supervised by General Nathanael Greene, and it was named Fort Putnam, after Rufus Putnam, George Washington's chief engineer. During the War of 1812, when the possibility of a British invasion led to the re-use of the site for defense, the newly-rebuilt fortification was named Fort Greene in General Greene's honor.

After the fort's military use had waned, poet Walt Whitman, then the editor of the Brooklyn Daily Eagle, strongly advocated for reclaiming the space for use as a public park. The City of Brooklyn had, by 1842, bought property around the fort from the Cowenhoven family, and in 1847 established what was then called Washington Park, Brooklyn's second park, after City Park (today called Commodore Barry Park).

In 1867, Frederick Law Olmsted and Calvert Vaux, designers of Central Park and Prospect Park, prepared a plan for the redesign of the park, the name of which was changed to Fort Greene Park.

In the aftermath of Hurricane Sandy, many parts of New York City were destroyed, including several trees in Fort Greene Park and the surrounding Fort Greene area.  

In February 2017, Parks Without Borders (PWB), the design unit of NYC Parks proposed "renovating" the park. Public opposition gave rise to the advocacy group, Friends of Fort Greene Park. The Landmarks Preservation Commission (LPC) took no vote, with one commissioner observing that the plan was "against every historic moment in the design of the park". The LPC later approved the plan after NYC Parks eliminated a proposed work by the late landscape architect Arthur Edwin Bye. Further controversy arose in early 2018 when New York City Parks Department (NYC Parks) announced plans to cut down some of its trees, and a group of residents successfully sued NYC Parks to force the release of an internal report about the trees, a decision upheld upon appeal.  the renovation was in the procurement process.

Monuments

Prison Ship Martyrs' Monument

One of the park's distinctive features is the Prison Ship Martyrs' Monument. During the Revolutionary War, the British kept American prisoners on ships in Wallabout Bay under terrible conditions. Around 11,500 prisoners died from disease and malnutrition. Olmsted and Vaux envisioned a crypt to hold their remains, with an appropriate monument. It was built, and the remains of the prisoners were re-interred there in 1873. A small monument was also built.

Eventually, funds were raised for a larger monument. The architectural firm of McKim, Mead, and White won a design competition, and the monument was unveiled in 1908 by President-elect William Howard Taft. At the top is an eight-ton bronze urn. At night the monument is illuminated by four electric lights set in four granite shafts. Bronze eagles grace each shaft, and two cannons guard the plaza and the Martyrs' crypt below.

Bust of Edward Snowden

In 2015, a bust of the former National Security Agency contractor Edward Snowden was illicitly erected in the park and taken down by park officials the same day.  The next day, it was replaced by a projected hologram.

Events
The park is host to the annual Fort Greene Park Summer Literary Festival, an event featuring young writers aged 7–18 reading alongside established writers, such as Sonia Sanchez, Amiri Baraka, Gloria Naylor, Jhumpa Lahiri, and Jennifer Egan, the last two being residents of the neighborhood. The Fort Greene Park Conservancy also operates a summer concert series. The Greene Glass Project was started in 2010 to address the then-thousands of shards of broken glass in the park. The organization was hosting annual cleanups in the summer as of 2015.

References

External links 

 Friends of Fort Greene Park

Fort Greene Park Conservancy website
New York City Department of Parks & Recreation
Photo gallery of monument and park

Urban public parks
Parks in Brooklyn
Robert Moses projects
Fort Greene, Brooklyn
Nature centers in New York City
Calvert Vaux designs